Dypsis prestoniana is a species of flowering plant in the family Arecaceae. It is found only in Madagascar. It is threatened by habitat loss.

References

prestoniana
Endemic flora of Madagascar
Vulnerable plants
Taxonomy articles created by Polbot
Taxa named by Henk Jaap Beentje